"My, Pierwsza Brygada" (We Are the First Brigade), also known as Marsz Pierwszej Brygady (The March of the First Brigade) and Legiony to żołnierska nuta (The Legions Are a Soldier's Song), is one of the best-known patriotic marches of the Polish Legions formed during World War I by Józef Piłsudski.

Extolling the First Brigade of the Polish Legions, the song is considered an important emblem of the early-20th-century struggle for Polish independence. It is also now an official anthem of the Polish Army.

The song melody was borrowed from Kielce March #10 in the songbook of the Kielce Fire Department band. It had probably been composed by Captain Andrzej Brzuchal-Sikorski, the band's conductor from 1905, and later bandmaster of the First Brigade of the Polish Legions. It was he who arranged and first conducted the song.

The earliest recognized version of the song appeared in 1917, the words being composed spontaneously during the war by several individuals including Colonel Andrzej Hałaciński and Legions officer Tadeusz Biernacki.

Between 1926 and 1927, many of Piłsudski's supporters viewed the song as the national anthem of Poland.

Notes 

1917 songs
National symbols of Poland
Polish Legions in World War I
Polish patriotic songs
Songs of World War I
Songs about soldiers
Songs about the military
Polish military marches